Santo Spirito is a Roman Catholic church located on piazzetta Santo Spirito in Bergamo, region of Lombardy, Italy.

History
The church was founded in the 1300s by Cardinal Guglielmo Longo, along with an adjacent hospital and a convent of the Celestine order of Benedictines. In 1475, it was allocated to the Canons Regular of the Lateran.

In the early 1500s it was refurbished; in the 1530 to 1535, the nave was rebuilt with five chapels on each side. Pietro Isabello participated in the 16th-century reconstruction; in 1720, the next refurbishment was led by Giovanni Battista Caniana.

Interior decoration

In the first chapel on the right are two canvases: Deposition by Giulio Carpioni and a Miracle of St Antony of Padua by Domenico Viani. In the second chapel on the right was built in 1512 using designs by Pietro Isabello, and originally had the altarpiece of Andrea Previtali, now found in the first chapel on the left.

In the fourth chapel is a prominent Lorenzo Lotto painting of the Madonna and Child with Saints Catherine of Alexandria, Augustine, Sebastian, and Antony Abbott (1521). It is flanked by two canvases: Daniel in the Lion's Den and St Francis receives Stigma by Gian Paolo Cavagna. On the main altar of the presbytery are sculptures that once formed part of the funeral monument of Agostino and Caterina Tasso. The wooden choir, only 17 of the original 50 stalls, was carved in the 16th century.

In the first chapel on the left is the funeral monument of Agostino and Caterina Tasso and a painting of the Madonna and Child, with Ss. Peter and Paul and Angel by Scipione Piazza. There is also a canvas depicting St John Baptist and other Saints by Andrea Previtali. In the second chapel on the left is a polyptych depicting the Descent of the Holy Spirit upon the Madonna and Apostles (1507) by Ambrogio Bergognone. In the third chapel on the left is a 14th-century altarpiece depicting Madonna del Buon Consiglio and Child. In the fourth chapel on the left are paintings depicting the Passion of Christ attributed to Pietro Rotari.

References

16th-century Roman Catholic church buildings in Italy
Churches in Bergamo
Roman Catholic churches completed in 1535
Renaissance architecture in Lombardy